Hamr may refer to:

Places in the Czech Republic
 Hamr (Jindřichův Hradec District), a municipality and village in the South Bohemian Region
 Hamr na Jezeře, a municipality and village in the Liberec Region
 Hamr, a village and part of Litvínov in the Ústí nad Labem Region
 Hamr, a village and part of Val (Tábor District) in the South Bohemian Region

Other
Heat-assisted magnetic recording (HAMR), a technology for hard disk data storage

See also
Hamry (disambiguation)